was the son of Hōjō Sōun, founder of the Go-Hōjō clan. He continued his father's quest to gain control of the Kantō (the central area, today dominated by Tokyo, of Japan's main island).

Biography
In 1524, Ujitsuna took Edo Castle, which was controlled by Uesugi Tomooki, thus beginning a long-running rivalry between the Hōjō and Uesugi families.

In 1526, Hojo Ujitsuna was defeated by Takeda Nobutora in the Battle of Nashinokidaira. Later, the Uesugi attacked and burned Tsurugaoka Hachimangū in Kamakura, which was a major loss to the Hōjō symbolically, because the earlier Hōjō clan from which they took their name fell in the Siege of Kamakura (1333). (Ujitsuna soon started rebuilding Tsurugaoka Hachimangū and was completed in 1540.) In 1530, his son Ujiyasu defeated Uesugi Tomooki in the Battle of Ozawahara. 

The Uesugi attacked Edo again in 1535, when Ujitsuna was away fighting the Takeda; however, Ujitsuna returned and defeated Uesugi Tomooki reclaiming his lands.

When Uesugi Tomooki died in 1537, Ujitsuna took the opportunity to occupy Musashi province and seize Kawagoe Castle to secure his control of the Kantō.

In 1538, Ujitsuna then went on to win the battle of Kōnodai, securing Shimōsa Province for the Hōjō.

In 1539, he defeated the Koga Kubo Yoshiaki (Oyumi Kubo) and gained control of Awa Province (Chiba).

Over the next several years before his death in 1541, Ujitsuna oversaw the rebuilding of Kamakura, making it a symbol of the growing power of the Hōjō, along with Odawara and Edo. He was succeeded as head of the Hōjō clan and lord of Odawara by his son Hōjō Ujiyasu.

Family
 Father: Hojo Soun
 Younger Brother: Hōjō Genan
 Mother: Nan’nyoin-dono
 Wife: Yojuin-dono
 Concubine: Konoe-dono
 Children:
 Hojo Ujiyasu by Yojuin-dono
 Hōjō Tsunashige (Adopted child)
 Hojo Tamemasa (1520-1542)
 Hojo Ujitaka (1522-1562)
 Joshin’in married Ota Suketaka
 daughter married Kira Yoriyasu
 Hoshun’in married Ashikaga Haruuji
 Sakihime married Horikoshi Sadatomo
 Daichoin married Hojo Tsunamori
 Chiyo married Katsurayama Ujimoto

References

Turnbull, Stephen (2002). 'War in Japan: 1467–1615'. Oxford: Osprey Publishing.

1487 births
1541 deaths
Go-Hōjō clan
Daimyo